German submarine U-515 was a Type IXC U-boat of Nazi Germany's Kriegsmarine built for service during World War II.
She was commissioned on 21 February 1942 and sunk on 9 April 1944. U-515 completed seven operational patrols and sank 23 ships, badly damaged two ships which later sank, and damaged two additional ships.

Design
German Type IXC submarines were slightly larger than the original Type IXBs. U-515 had a displacement of  when at the surface and  while submerged. She had two shafts and two  propellers.

U-515 was fitted with six  torpedo tubes (four fitted at the bow and two at the stern), 22 torpedoes, one  SK C/32 naval gun, 180 rounds, and a  SK C/30 as well as a  C/30 anti-aircraft gun. The boat had a complement of forty-eight.

Service history
U-515s keel was laid down on 8 May 1941 at Deutsche Werft in Hamburg, Germany. She was launched on 2 December 1941, commissioned on 21 February 1942 under the command of Kapitänleutnant Werner Henke, and attached to the 4th U-boat Flotilla for training. During this period, U-515 conducted listening tests in early May, torpedo firing tests, and in early July tactical exercises with other U-boats. U-515 served with the 4th U-boat Flotilla until 31 August 1942. She then joined the 10th U-boat Flotilla for operations.

First patrol
U-515 left Stettin on 8 September 1942 stopping at Kiel to top-up with fuel. She left Kiel on 11 September for her first patrol, during which she sank nine ships, and damaged one other:
Stanvac Melbourne – Panamanian tanker, sunk on 12 September by torpedoes
Woensdrecht – Dutch tanker, sunk on 12 September by torpedoes
Nimba – Panamanian freighter, sunk on 13 September by torpedoes
Ocean Vanguard – British freighter, sunk on 13 September by torpedoes
Harborough – British freighter, sunk on 14 September by torpedo and deck gun
Sørholt – Norwegian freighter, sunk on 15 September by torpedoes
Mae – American freighter, sunk on 17 September with deck gun
Reedpool – British freighter, sunk on 20 September by torpedoes
Lindvangen – Norwegian freighter, sunk on 23 September by torpedoes

U-515 returned to her base at Lorient, in occupied France on 14 October.

Second patrol
U-515 left Lorient on 7 November for her second patrol. While moving along the African coast, on the night of 11 November, she attacked a British depot ship (probably HMS Hecla, which was attacked on 11 November and sank on the 12th), and was subsequently depth-charged by a British destroyer (probably HMS Venomous). While sailing through the mid-Atlantic on 6 December, the U-boat spotted and sank the passenger ship . U-515 patrolled the Azores for about a week, then returned to Lorient on 5 or 6 January 1943.

Third patrol
Minor repairs were carried out, and on 21 February 1943, the U-boat left Lorient for her third patrol. She sank the British freighter, California Star about 335 miles northwest of the Azores on 4 March and on 9 April she sank a second ship, the French freighter Bamako off the west African coast. On 29 April the U-boat was attacked by Catalina flying-boats. U-515 fired at the aircraft with her 20 mm anti-aircraft guns, but did not shoot any down. The aircraft did not cause any damage to her, she submerged after the attack. During a 12-hour period on the night of 30 April and 1 May, U-515 attacked convoy TS 37 off Freetown and sank seven ships:

Kota Tjandi – Dutch freighter, sunk on 30 April by torpedoes
Bandar Shapour – British freighter, sunk on 30 April by torpedoes
Corabella – British freighter, sunk on 30 April by torpedoes
Nagina – British freighter, sunk on 30 April by torpedoes
Mokambo – Belgian freighter, attacked on 1 May with torpedoes, sank on 2 May
City of Singapore – British freighter, sunk on 1 May by torpedoes
Clan MacPherson – British freighter, sunk on 1 May by torpedoes
She continued on her patrol and on 9 May sank the Norwegian freighter Cornville with torpedoes. U-515 completed her third sortie, returning to Lorient on 24 June. In recognition of a successful patrol, all crewmen were given long leaves and many awarded the Iron Cross, Second class.

Fourth patrol
Extensive repairs and modifications were carried out at Lorient. The after part of the bridge was expanded and equipped with 20mm anti-aircraft cannon and a 37mm flak gun. She also carried four T5 Zaunkönig acoustic homing torpedoes. U-515 left Lorient on 29 August to patrol the west coast of Africa. About one week in, she spotted a convoy off the Azores and started to attack; however, she was detected by a convoy escort and badly damaged by depth charges, which forced her to return to base for repairs, reaching Lorient on 12 September.

Fifth patrol
Repairs took six weeks and were completed by late October. On 1 November 1943, U-515 left Lorient, stopping at St. Nazaire to pick up two T5 Zaunkönig torpedoes, which were designed with either a magnetic or percussion fuze and which were faster and had a longer range than the G7e/T4 Falke torpedoes. U-515 left St. Nazaire on 9 November and started patrolling off the Azores and Portuguese coast. On the morning of 18 November, she spotted a convoy, but was in turn spotted by aircraft. The U-boat submerged, but was detected by destroyers. These three ships depth-charged U-515 for several hours and caused major damage. The main ballast tank and reserve oil tank were ruptured; several batteries, the electronics, and the forward hydroplane motor were also damaged. U-515 fired a T-5 acoustic torpedo at one of the escorts, hitting her and causing damage beyond repair. Several more attacks were made and U-515 had nearly run out of air when the attacks finally stopped, and she was able to surface. Despite extensive damage, the crew decided to make repairs at sea, which were completed on 22 November. U-515 started to patrol the west coast of Africa and on 17 December, torpedoed and sank the British freighter Kingswood. Two days later she sank another ship, the British freighter Phemius. While returning to base, she sank the British freighter  on 24 December. On 16 January 1944 U-515 reached Lorient.

Sixth and final patrol

Major repairs were carried out on U-515, including the installation of new batteries. Repairs were completed by late March and on the 30th, she left Lorient. On 8 April 1944, U-515 spotted a carrier-based aircraft and submerged; an hour later she surfaced and was attacked by another aircraft. U-515 engaged the machine with her 3.7-cm anti-aircraft gun. The plane's bombs missed the U-boat and U-515 failed to shoot down the aircraft.

Flooding and loss of depth control forced the U-Boat to the surface, where she was sunk by rockets fired from Grumman Avenger and Grumman Wildcat aircraft and gunfire from the destroyers.

Sixteen of U-515s crew were killed, but 44 survived the attack. The survivors were picked up by the destroyers and later transferred to the aircraft carrier  U-515s commander, Werner Henke, was among the survivors. Later in June 1944, he was shot and killed trying to escape a secret interrogation center known as P. O. Box 1142 in Fort Hunt, Virginia, while being held as a prisoner of war.

Tonnage sunk
During U-515s career, she sank 23 ships and damaged two others which later sank, plus damaging another two ships which did not sink.

Wolfpacks
U-515 took part in four wolfpacks, namely:
 Westwall (8 November – 16 December 1942) 
 Unverzagt (12 – 19 March 1943) 
 Seeräuber (25 – 30 March 1943) 
 Schill 1 (16 – 22 November 1943)

Summary of raiding history

References

Notes

Citations

Bibliography

Miller, D. U-Boats: the Illustrated History of the Raiders of the Deep. Washington: Brassey's Inc, 2000.
Navy Department Office of the Chief of Naval Operations, Washington. Report of the interrogation of survivors from U-515 sunk on 9 April 1944 and U-68 sunk on 10 April 1944. Washington, 17 June 1944. Retrieved 30 May 2007. From

External links

World War II submarines of Germany
German Type IX submarines
U-boats commissioned in 1942
U-boats sunk in 1944
1941 ships
Ships built in Hamburg
U-boats sunk by US aircraft
U-boats sunk by US warships
U-boats sunk by depth charges
World War II shipwrecks in the Atlantic Ocean
Maritime incidents in April 1944